Carly Gullickson and Travis Parrott were the defending champions, but lost in the first round to Gisela Dulko and Pablo Cuevas.

Liezel Huber and Bob Bryan won the title, defeating Květa Peschke and Aisam-ul-Haq Qureshi in the final 6–4, 6–4.

Seeds

Draw

Finals

Top half

Bottom half

External links
Main draw
2010 US Open – Doubles draws and results at the International Tennis Federation

Mixed Doubles
US Open (tennis) by year – Mixed doubles